Gusinaya Lyaga is a rural locality (a selo) in Partizansky Selsoviet, Burlinsky District, Altai Krai, Russia. The population was 275 as of 2013. It was founded in 1907. There are 5 streets.

Geography 
Gusinaya Lyaga is located 12 km northeast of Burla (the district's administrative centre) by road. Novopeschanoye is the nearest rural locality.

References 

Rural localities in Burlinsky District